Tamarac National Wildlife Refuge is a National Wildlife Refuge of the United States. It was established in 1938 as a refuge breeding ground for migratory birds and other wildlife.

Local topography consists of rolling forested hills interspersed with lakes, rivers, marshes, bogs and shrub swamps. The token of the refuge is the tamarack, or tamarac tree. This unusual tree is a deciduous conifer which turns a brilliant gold before losing its needles each fall.

Tamarac National Wildlife Refuge lies in the heart of one of the most diverse vegetative transition zones in North America, where northern hardwood forests, coniferous forests and the tallgrass prairie converge. This diversity of habitat brings with it a wealth of wildlife, both woodland and prairie species.

An attractive visitor center offers a spectacular vista of the marshes and trees that are typical of the Tamarac Refuge. A theater presentation provides orientation to the life and legends of this unique area.

References

External links
Refuge website

National Wildlife Refuges in Minnesota
Protected areas of Becker County, Minnesota
Protected areas established in 1938
Wetlands of Minnesota
Landforms of Becker County, Minnesota
1938 establishments in Minnesota